Creatures of Barsaive is a supplement published by FASA in 1994 for the fantasy role-playing game Earthdawn.

Contents
Creatures of Barsaive, by Fraser Cain, is a bestiary describing fifty more creatures found in Barsaive. The information is provided by the great dragon Vasdenjas, who is dictating his reminiscences to a dwarven scribe.

Some of the creatures are original creations, some are more traditional creatures that are given a background suited to the Earthdawn setting.

Reception
In the July 1995 edition of Dragon (Issue #219), Allen Varney noted that like other Earthdawn supplements, this book "takes a creative approach to its well-worn subject." Varney thought using a dragon's point-of-view "reveals much about draconic psychology, and his dialogues with the scribe make the text a delight to read."

Reviews
Rollespilsmagasinet Fønix (Danish) (Issue 8 - May/June 1995)

References

Earthdawn supplements
Role-playing game supplements introduced in 1994